Snowflame is a supervillain appearing in comic books published by DC Comics. The character was created by Steve Englehart and Cary Bates to serve as a villain for the superhero team the New Guardians. He also appeared in the New 52 continuity as an enemy of Catwoman.

Character biography

Origins 
Snowflame first appeared in the 1988 comic book New Guardians #2 in a story titled Jungle Snow. In it, he meets the New Guardians in Colombia as the leader of a drug cartel. In their first encounter he defeats the superhero team, but is later killed by them in a chemical shed explosion.

New 52 
In Catwoman #23, Catwoman travels to South America where she meets Snowflame, whose real name is revealed to be Stefan. Snowflame reveals that he faked his death in the chemical shed explosion in order to take over the island of Isla Nevada. He then escorts Catwoman to his home where he is auctioning off expensive and dangerous artefacts to other supervillains. In Catwoman #24, Catwoman sneaks into the jungle and meets Kisin, the island's mythical giant panther and god of death, before returning to do battle with Snowflame. She defeats him with the help of Kisin, who kills Snowflame.

Superpowers 
Snowflame gets his powers from snorting cocaine. The powers he gains include superhuman strength, speed, immunity to pain, and pyrokinesis. He also has the ability to give foes an instant contact high.

In other media 
Snowflame is the main character in a fan-made webcomic by artist Julie Sydor, which reimagines the character as part of the Gotham City setting in order to delve deeper into his characterization.

References 

DC Comics supervillains
Characters created by Steve Englehart
Characters created by Cary Bates
Fictional cocaine users
Fictional Colombian people
Fictional characters with fire or heat abilities
Comics characters introduced in 1988